Bünüş may refer to the following places in Turkey:

 Bünüş, Bolu, a village in the district of Bolu, Bolu Province
 Bünüş, Gerede, a village in the district of Gerede, Bolu Province